Dicanticinta diticinctana is a species of moth of the family Tortricidae. It is found in Japan (the islands of Honshu, Kyushu and Hokkaido) and possibly China.

The wingspan is 15–16 mm. Adults are on wing from the end of June to mid-July.

The larvae have been recorded feeding on Syringa reticulata.

References

Moths described in 1900
Archipini